Huangtiandao (黃天道 "Way of the Yellow Sky / Heaven", also written with the homophonous characters 皇天道 "Way of the Kingly Sky"), also known as Huangtianism (黄天教 Huángtiān jiào) or Xuanguism (悬鼓教 Xuángǔ jiào, "Dark Drum teaching"), is a Chinese folk religious sect of northern China. It was founded by Li Bin (李賓), a former soldier who retired after losing an eye, in 1553 in Xuanhua, Hebei.

See also
 Chinese folk religion
 Chinese salvationist religions

References

Sources
 
 
 

Chinese salvationist religions